Ida Olivia Keeling ( Potter, May 15, 1915 – August 25, 2021) was an American centenarian track and field athlete. Trained by her daughter Cheryl (Shelley) Keeling, herself a world record holder, Ida set Masters records in 60 meter and 100 meter distances for women in the 95-99 and 100-plus age groups.

Her story was featured in a segment in the Carl Reiner-hosted documentary If You're Not in the Obit, Eat Breakfast, on aging over 90, which premiered on HBO in June 2017. Ida was also featured on Our America with Lisa Ling on the Oprah Winfrey Network.

Sports records

60 metres and 100 metre dash
In 2011, at 95 years old, Keeling set the world record in her age group for running 60 meters at 29.86 seconds at a track meet in Manhattan, and in 2012 she set the W95 American record at the USATF Eastern Regional Conference Championships at 51.85. In 2014, at the 2014 Gay Games, Keeling set the fastest known time by a 99-year-old woman for the 100-meter dash at 59.80 seconds; at the time the relevant USA Track & Field webpage did not include a 100-meter record for US women older than the 90–94 age division.

100 metres
On April 30, 2016, Keeling became the first woman in history to complete a 100-meter run at the age of 100. Her time of 1:17.33 was witnessed by a crowd of 44,469 at the 2016 Penn Relays.

Personal life
Keeling's parents, Osborne and Mary Potter, emigrated to the United States from the island of Anegada in the British Virgin Islands. She was raised in Harlem, New York.

Keeling's mother died when Ida was young and her husband died of a heart attack when she was 42. She had four children, two of whom, Charles and Donald, died in drug-related killings in 1978 and 1980 respectively. Her elder daughter, Laura, worked as the CEO of two National Urban League affiliates. Her younger daughter, Shelley, is a lawyer and real estate investor who also coached for a local high school. Shelley also coached her mother and first convinced her to run in a "mini-run" at the age of 67.

In the book Can’t Nothing Bring Me Down: Chasing Myself in the Race against Time (2018), by Ida Keeling and Anita Diggs, Ida explained the secret to her health and fitness, stating she worked out 2-4 times a week and attended dancing classes. Her diet consisted of greens, fruit and cod liver oil, and she would have Hennessy with her coffee once a week.

She died in August 2021 at the age of 106.

Additional 
List of centenarian masters track and field athletes

References

External links
 Indoor 60m at age 102'''
 Ida's website "Healthy past 100"

1915 births
2021 deaths
American centenarians
People from Harlem
Sportspeople from Manhattan
Track and field athletes from New York City
Women centenarians
World record holders in masters athletics
American people of British Virgin Islands descent